The Order of Merit of the Free State of Saxony is a civil order of merit, and the highest award of the German state of Saxony.  First presented in 1997, it is awarded by the Minister-President of Saxony.  The order is presented to individuals who have made outstanding contributions to the people and state of Saxony.  The award is limited to a total of 500 living recipients.  As of October 2020, it has been awarded 349 times.

Recipients

 Kurt Biedenkopf
 Prince Edward, Duke of Kent
 Peter Fulde
 Václav Klaus
 Felix Kolmer
 Reiner Kunze
 Adolf Merckle
 Georg Milbradt
 Karel Schwarzenberg
 Erwin Teufel
 Stanislaw Tillich
 Hanne Wandtke
 Udo Zimmermann

References 

Orders, decorations, and medals of the states of Germany
Orders, decorations, and medals of Saxony
Awards established in 1997